Papilio oenomaus is a butterfly of the family Papilionidae. It is found on Timor and surrounding islands.

The wingspan is 120–130 mm.

Subspecies
Papilio oenomaus oenomaus (Timor, Leti, Moa, Kissar, Romang Islands)
Papilio oenomaus subfasciatus Rothschild, 1895 (Wetar)

External links

Butterflycorner.net

oenomaus
Butterflies described in 1819